14 Wall Street, originally the Bankers Trust Company Building, is a skyscraper at the intersection of Wall Street and Nassau Street in the Financial District of Manhattan in New York City. It is composed of the original 540-foot tower at the southeastern corner of the site, as well as a shorter annex wrapping around the original tower.

The original tower was erected on the site of the Stevens Building at 12–14 Wall Street and the Gillender Building at 16 Wall Street. It was built in 1910–1912 and was designed by Trowbridge & Livingston in the neoclassical style as the headquarters for Bankers Trust. A 25-story addition with Art Deco detailing, designed by Shreve, Lamb & Harmon, was constructed in 1931–1933 to replace three other structures. After new buildings for Bankers Trust were erected in 1962 and 1974, the company moved employees away from 14 Wall Street, and eventually sold the building in 1987.

14 Wall Street's tower incorporates a seven-story pyramidal roof inspired by the Mausoleum at Halicarnassus. The interior of the building contained numerous amenities that were considered state-of-the-art at the time of its construction; the first three floors were used as Bankers Trust's headquarters, while the rest were rented to tenants. A notable building in Manhattan's skyline in the early 20th century, the building was featured prominently in Bankers Trust's early imagery. The building was designated a New York City landmark in 1997. It is also a contributing property to the Wall Street Historic District, a National Register of Historic Places district created in 2007.

Site 

14 Wall Street is in the Financial District of Manhattan, bounded by Nassau Street to the east, Wall Street to the south, and Pine Street to the north. Nearby buildings include the Equitable Building to the north, Federal Hall National Memorial (formerly the sub-Treasury building) at 26 Wall Street to the east, 23 Wall Street to the southeast, the New York Stock Exchange Building to the south, 1 Wall Street to the southwest, and 100 Broadway to the west.

The original building is located at the southeast corner of the site, which was previously occupied by the Stevens and Gillender buildings. In 1880, the Sampson family developed their lots along 12–14 Wall Street into the Stevens Building, which stood until 1910.

The annex occupies the remainder of the plot and is L-shaped in plan. Prior to the construction of the annex, the land below it was occupied by three buildings. The seven-story Astor Building was located at 10–12 Wall Street, directly to the west of the original tower. The Hanover National Building at 5–11 Nassau Street, erected in 1903, was a 21-story building north of the original Bankers Trust Building, which extended to Pine Street. The final building on the lot was 7 Pine Street, a 10-story building to the northwest of the original tower.

Architecture 
In addition, 14 Wall Street contains four basement levels; the topmost basement is partially raised above ground level. The original structure was designed by Trowbridge & Livingston for Bankers Trust between 1910 and 1912. An addition to the north and west was designed by Shreve, Lamb & Harmon and constructed between 1931 and 1933.

14 Wall Street's "granite-clad roof and its specifically Greek architectural motifs", as described by architectural writer Sarah Landau, which were a departure from earlier designs. The architects wrote that the style had been chosen for its "simplicity and grace, as well as its supreme dignity and seriousness", which fit both the site and the building's use. Inspirations include the Erechtheion, the Mausoleum of Halicarnassus, and "ancient Macedonian prototypes".

Form 

The original structure is a 39-story tower without any setbacks, composed of 32 stories topped by a seven-story roof. The concept behind the original structure's design was to place a pyramidal roof, similar to that of the Mausoleum of Halicarnassus, on top of a tower like Venice's St Mark's Campanile bell tower. Trowbridge wanted to enhance "the beauty of the upper part of building by a loggia and a stone pyramid, in place of the usual flat or mansard roof." This was one of the first times a pyramidal roof had been used in a skyscraper (after only the Metropolitan Life Insurance Company Tower); previous tall structures had been capped by a cupola, spire, or tempietto.

The rest of the building is surrounded by a 25-story annex, which wraps around the western and northern sides of the original tower. The Wall Street side has setbacks at the 15th, 22nd, and 25th floors and the Nassau Street side has a setback at the 23rd floor. The Pine Street side has a light court above the 11th story, which cuts through the center of that side.

Facade

Original building 
The original tower is arranged into four sections: a base of 5 stories, a midsection of 21 stories, a top section of 6 stories (including the 32nd-story penthouse), and the roof. The base was originally four stories, but the present third floor was added in the 1931–1933 renovation. On each side are five window bays, each of which contain two windows per floor. The design of each side is largely identical, except that the western facade's midsection is made of brick rather than granite.

Because 14 Wall Street was surrounded on all sides by other skyscrapers, thereby limiting visibility of the lower section, the lower floors were designed with intricate detail. The upper basement and the first floor were arranged as a stylobate that supported a colonnade above it. The basement facade is smooth, while the first-floor facade consists of rusticated blocks. An entrance porch, with the address 16 Wall Street, faces the Wall Street side. A colonnade above it spans the second through fourth floors. The colonnade consists of Greek fluted columns, molded belt courses, and moldings and was "almost Puritanical in its simplicity". The facade of the lower stories was rearranged slightly when the current third story was created, with new spandrel panels being added to separate the double-height windows that formerly spanned the double-height second story. The fifth story is the topmost story of the base and has a deep cornice at the top. The cornice contains motifs of lions' heads and rosettes.

The midsection begins at the sixth story and rises through the 26th story. It is mostly faced in buff-colored granite. Each bay contains two windows. There are slightly projecting vertical piers separating each bay, except at the corners, which have grooves that make them appear as though they were panels. There is a band course above the sixth floor but there is otherwise no horizontal ornamentation.

The 27th through 31st stories are decorated with engaged Ionic columns in antis. On the 27th through 29th stories, the north, east, and south facades are set back behind colonnades, while the west facade extends outward to the columns of the colonnade. Rectangular windows are located on the 30th and 31st stories, with a cornice between the stories. The 32nd floor is slightly set back and serves as a penthouse. A molded cornice runs above the 32nd story. There are 24 steps between the bottom and top of the roof. Smoke is ventilated from openings at the top of the roof, giving it a pyramid-like appearance.

Annex 
The annex's facade is made of granite at the base and limestone on the upper stories. It was designed to defer to the "solid and robust architecture" of the original building. The facade of the annex is arranged in two styles. The Wall Street facade contains setbacks at lower stories, and the window arrangement is aligned with that of the original building. The base consists of four stories. Like the original tower, the first floor is rusticated and the second through fourth floors contain a colonnade. On upper stories, wide piers divide each bay and narrow piers divide each window. The piers are ribbed and are designed in a modernistic style. The spandrels between each row of windows are decorated aluminum panels.

The Pine Street and Nassau Street facades are designed to be more modern with motifs in the Modern Classic and Art Deco styles. Due to variations in the lot lines on the annex's site, the annex projects  further onto the street than did the original building. In addition to an entrance at the center of the annex's Nassau Street side, there are service entrances on Pine Street. The annex facades contain carved ornament, curved piers at the base, wrought-iron gates and grilles, and an eagle sculpture above the entrance on Nassau Street. There are five bays on Nassau Street and eleven on Pine Street; the bays each contain between one and three windows. The base is two stories tall, excluding the basement, which is partially visible as Nassau Street slopes downward from Pine Street toward Wall Street. The design of the upper stories' facade is similar to that on the Wall Street side.

Structural features 
Concrete was then poured in between these caissons to create a watertight,  cofferdam. The membrane was needed because the surrounding ground was filled with quicksand. Afterward, the lot was excavated, the Gillender Building's foundations were removed, and deep foundations were placed within the lot. Due to high pressure on the cofferdam, temporary timber trusses were used to brace the cofferdam. A  pad of concrete, overlaid with waterproof-cement, was then placed at the bottom of the pit. The method was not only cheaper than the then-standard method of driving caissons down to bedrock, but also provided space for more basement floors.

The second floor does not contain any columns because of the elaborate network of heavy trusses used to support the outer walls. "Unusually heavy bracing" is also used to support the fourth floor. Otherwise, a standard girder-and-column steel structure is utilized within the building.

Interior

Bankers Trust offices 

The builders ensured that 14 Wall Street would be constructed with fireproof material. Metal was used in place of the wood trim that was used for decoration in other buildings, and a sprinkler system was placed in the roof. Bankers Trust's offices occupied basement levels A and B, as well as the first through fourth stories. These offices were designed "in a pure classic style"; the metalwork in the offices was a light-colored bronze, while Italian marble lined the main banking spaces on the first and second floors. The main banking room was designed in a Greek style and had  ceilings. The tellers' counters inside the second-floor banking room were originally aligned with the positions of the windows. The fourth floor contained the board room.

Three elevators connected the Bankers Trust office floors and rose only to the fourth floor. Unusually for buildings of the time, the lower portion of the shared elevator shaft was covered in marble, while the upper portion was plate glass. At the time of the building's opening, a magazine observed that the offices used modular equipment that could be moved easily in case the company needed to expand. Further, the floor surfaces were made of cork; each department had telephone service; and pneumatic tube systems made it easy to send papers between different departments.

At the center of the Wall Street side, a wide staircase led to the first floor. Initially, this was the main entrance to the Bankers Trust offices. The lobby contains a bronze gate with symbols of capitalist enterprises such as metallurgy, shipping, construction, power, agriculture, manufacturing, and mining. Allegorical paintings in the lobby depicted similar motifs. When the building was expanded from 1931 to 1933, the former banking room on the first floor was converted into an officers' seating area, and the floor level was raised to harmonize with the new extension. The double-height second story was divided into two stories, and the third story was created. The new addition, with the address 16 Wall Street, contained a T-shaped banking room covering , with "a forest of squared-off, trunk-like columns clad in Oregon myrtle".

In two of the four basement floors was "the strongest vault in the world", measuring two stories high and  inside. This would prevent both standard explosives and oxyacetylene cutters from penetrating the vault. The columns and beams that reinforce the vault are so strong that "a shock sufficient to disturb the vault would bring the building down in ruins upon it". Inside, the vault was split into numerous aisles with combination locks; each safe in the vault required two officers to open.

Upper stories 
The remaining stories were rented to various tenants. When the building first opened, entry to these floors was via an entrance on the western portion of the Wall Street facade, where a passageway linked to the Hanover Bank Building to the north. During the 1931–1933 expansion, a new entrance was built on Pine Street. A system of eleven elevators connected the lobby to the rental floors, consisting of five "express" elevators, five "local" elevators, and one "relief" elevator. The "express" elevators ran nonstop from the lobby to serve the upper floors while the "local" elevators served the lower floors and the "relief" elevators served all floors. There was an additional elevator serving the 30th through 38th floors. These stories contained floor surfaces made of concrete; walls of marble, plaster, and terracotta; and doors, window sash, and trim made of metal but finished to look like mahogany. A continuous 531-step staircase runs from the third floor to the 29th floor.

The present-day 32nd floor, the highest story beneath the roof, once served as an apartment, which J. P. Morgan had an option to occupy. He chose not to pursue the option due to antitrust proceedings ongoing against Bankers Trust at the time of the building's completion. The New York Times reported at the building's 1912 opening that $250,000 had been spent on "teakwood furniture, priceless rugs, luxurious baths, and a private observation balcony", though it was "entirely devoid of furniture". Christopher Gray, an architectural critic for the Times, wrote in 2007 that there had been unsubstantiated rumors that Morgan used the apartment as a private getaway. In 1997, the 32nd floor was converted into an upscale French restaurant called The 14 Wall Street, which closed in early 2006. Under the roof are more than 20 storage rooms, as well as records, a water tank, and elevator equipment.

History

Context and land acquisition 

Bankers Trust was founded in 1903 when a number of commercial banks needed a vehicle to enter the trusts and estates market. The company originally was located at Liberty and Washington Streets, with eight staff working in two basement rooms. The Bankers Trust ultimately acquired space in the Gillender Building, having been induced to move there because of the proximity of the New York Stock Exchange. The company, with J. P. Morgan on the board, grew rapidly and intended to land itself permanently in the "vortex of America's financial life".

During the latter part of the decade, financial institutions such as the Bank of Montreal, the Fourth National Bank, and the Germania Life Insurance Company acquired properties on Wall and Nassau Streets. Bankers Trust started to negotiate the purchase of the Gillender Building in April 1909. However, it was the adjacent seven-story Stevens Building that Bankers Trust acquired first; that July, the trust leased the Stevens Building for 84 years at a cost of $1.5 million. At the time, the press reported that Bankers Trust would erect a 16-story office building wrapping around the Gillender Building. George B. Post, hired as a "professional advisor", proposed the new building as an L-shaped structure.

In November, Bankers Trust finalized an agreement to buy the Gillender Building from Helen Gillender. The next month, the Manhattan Trust Company acquired the Gillender Building for $1.5 million, then a record amount for land in New York City. Manhattan Trust then resold the Gillender Building to Bankers Trust for $1.25 million, although Manhattan Trust retained long-term lease rights for the ground floor as well as various other spaces. According to The New York Times, Manhattan Trust and Bankers Trust had colluded to acquire the Gillender Building. During this time, Bankers Trust acquired a majority share in the Guaranty Trust Company; although the latter remained in its old headquarters, the same people served on both companies' boards of directors. Bankers Trust and the Mercantile Trust Company also merged, but because Mercantile Trust's headquarters burned in a January 1912 fire, this affected planning for the new building. Bankers Trust absorbed Manhattan Trust in February 1912: both companies had been owned by Morgan, and the proximity of the companies' spaces was cited as a reason for the merger.

Construction and early use 
To maximize land utilization, Bankers Trust desired to build a structure taller than either the Gillender or Stevens buildings.  To "obtain the very best results" for the design, in 1909, Bankers Trust requested plans from four architects and architecture firms: Carrère and Hastings, Francis H. Kimball, Trowbridge and Livingston, and Warren and Wetmore. Ultimately, Trowbridge and Livingston's bid was accepted. The firm submitted plans for 14 Wall Street to the New York City Department of Buildings on April 20, 1910.

Initial building 

The first stage of construction commenced in April 1910 with the demolition of the Gillender Building, which The New York Times claimed to be the first skyscraper that was demolished to make way for a taller skyscraper. Demolition of the Stevens Building started the same month, and both buildings had been demolished by June 1910. After the site had been cleared, foundation work was started. Foundational work was stymied due to the quicksand in the ground, as well as the presence of redundant supports underneath the Gillender Building's site and the proximity of other buildings. Steel superstructure construction commenced after foundational work was completed in November 1910. Facade work commenced in February 1911, with contractor Marc Eidlitz & Son erecting the facade at a rate of three-and-a-half stories per week. The stonework was completed by September 15, 1911, except for the pyramid, for which there had been a minor change in design.

The basements and the three lower floors were to contain the headquarters of Bankers Trust, although its main operations would be housed elsewhere in less expensive offices. Most of the upper floors were slated to be rented to other companies. By May 1911, The Wall Street Journal reported that "a large amount of office space" had already been rented in the building. That November, The Wall Street Journal reported that the building was 65% rented. In April 1912, a month before the building's opening, a parachutist jumped from the 32nd floor of 14 Wall Street, landing on the roof of 26 Wall Street.

14 Wall Street was officially opened on May 20, 1912, at which point it was 85% rented. J.P. Morgan & Co. had originally planned to move into 14 Wall Street, with Morgan occupying the 32nd-story apartment. After Bankers Trust was investigated by the U.S. Congress's Pujo Committee for monopolistic practices, these plans were canceled and J.P. Morgan & Co. built another structure to the southeast at 23 Wall Street. By 1917, Bankers Trust had become a full-service bank, and one of the country's wealthiest financial institutions. Bankers Trust, having rented out the upper floors, found their existing space to be inadequate by the 1920s, with more than four times as many staff as in 1912. As a result, the company took up space in the Astor and Hanover Bank buildings.

Annex 
Bankers Trust began land acquisition in 1919, acquiring the Astor Building that June and the building at 7 Pine Street two months later. The Hanover Bank Building was not acquired until 1929, a decade later. By that time, Bankers Trust owned the eastern half of the block bounded by Broadway and Wall, Pine, and Nassau Streets. Architect Richmond Shreve described the situation as "[falling] short of a true expression of the [company's] position". In January 1931, Bankers Trust announced plans for the new structure, which would cost $5.5 million. Shreve's firm, Shreve, Lamb & Harmon, was hired to construct the annex.

Staff at 14 Wall Street were moved to a temporary location when work began in May 1931, and the Hanover Bank, Astor, and 7 Pine Street buildings were subsequently razed. That November, the builders implemented two 5-hour daily shifts for workers instead of a single eight-hour shift, doubling the number of jobs for workers as well as increasing daily productivity. The new 25-story annex was completed in 1932 and the staff moved back into 14 Wall Street. The old building was also renovated with the addition of the third floor and the relocation of the main entrances. These renovations were completed in March 1933. The following month, Bankers Trust officially opened the annex and started moving into seven stories of the annex. The project tripled 14 Wall Street's rentable area.

In January 1934, the First National Bank of New York (now Citibank) filed a lawsuit against Bankers Trust and the project contractors, alleging that the excavations had damaged its adjoining building at Broadway and Wall Street. Of the $881,500 that the First National Bank sought in damages, it was awarded about a quarter of that amount. That April, Bankers Trust was released from all liability for any damage caused during construction.

Later use

Bankers Trust occupancy 
The Bankers Trust Company had assets of $1 billion by 1935. In a sign of the company's financial stability, in 1943, Bankers Trust bought the land under 14 Wall Street from the Sampson family, whose Stevens Building had been demolished to make way for the original tower. The building was outfitted with a modern air-conditioning system in 1955. During this era, the bank continued to grow through mergers. The bank's second headquarters in Midtown Manhattan, at 280 Park Avenue, opened in 1962, though Bankers Trust retained occupancy at 14 Wall Street. The facade of 14 Wall Street was cleaned during the mid-1960s. When One Bankers Trust Plaza was completed in 1974, more employees were relocated out of 14 Wall Street and four other locations. Afterward, the eighth through 23rd floors of the Bankers Trust Building were vacant, representing , though these floors were gradually rented to other tenants.

Bankers Trust retained ownership of 14 Wall Street until 1987, when the building was sold to 14 Wall Street Associates, who subsequently sold the building to 14 Wall Street Realty in 1991 and to General Electric Investment in 1992. After buying 14 Wall Street, General Electric Investment started to renovate the building for $7 million. Though Bankers Trust retained a lease through the building until 2004, with an option to cancel in 1995, the company vacated the space earlier, in 1992. Manufacturers Hanover and the Chemical Bank then occupied the space that Bankers Trust had formerly used.

Subsequent occupancy 

Boston Properties agreed to buy 14 Wall Street for $320 million in August 1997. The tenant of the annex's banking room, Chase Bank, donated the space to the Skyscraper Museum for one year starting in 1998. During this time, the museum held an exhibition on the Empire State Building within the space. An investment group led by Laurence Gluck and Arthur Wrubel bought 14 Wall Street from General Electric Investment in 1999. The former banking room became an Equinox Fitness location in December 2000. The Rockwell Group designed an  mezzanine for the room.

Gluck had sole ownership of 14 Wall Street by 2004, and the next year, Leviev Boymelgreen bought the building from Gluck for $215 million. Initially, the new owners wanted to convert the entire building from offices into luxury condominiums, but in 2006, dropped the plan for residential conversion. Instead, Leviev Boymelgreen ultimately converted the lower stories to condos. Early the following year, Leviev Boymelgreen agreed to sell the property to Cushman & Wakefield for $325 million. Ultimately, 14 Wall Street was purchased by the Carlyle Group and Capstone Equities, who planned to renovate the building for $50 million, including $5 million for the restoration of the lobby. Five years later, majority control of the building was sold for $303 million in cash to Alexander Rovt, a Ukrainian fertilizer tycoon who paid off the building's outstanding debt as part of the deal. At the time of the purchase, it had  of vacant space, and three potential tenants were in discussion to lease about two-thirds of that amount. After $60 million of renovations, the building was 90% leased by early 2016. Cushman & Wakefield handled leasing for 14 Wall Street until it was replaced by the CBRE Group in 2017.

Tenants 
 Aflac
 Amerigroup
 Equinox Fitness
 FDM Group
 NYU Langone Medical Center
 Posse Foundation
 IWG
 TheStreet.com

Impact 
At the time of its completion, 14 Wall Street was the world's tallest bank building and the city's third- or fourth-tallest skyscraper. 14 Wall Street and the nearby Singer Tower, as viewed from Manhattan's waterfront, resembled "the posts of the gigantic 'Gateway of New York. Cassier's Magazine wrote that the building "presents a beautiful and impressive appearance, free from ornate decoration", though the magazine misattributed the building as being influenced by Egyptian pyramids. The building was perceived by several observers as a symbol of the future. During the early 20th century, Bankers Trust used imagery of 14 Wall Street in its advertising to depict it as a "tower of strength"; the bank used the icon and slogan until the 1980s.

The iconography persisted even after the annex was constructed. 14 Wall Street's likeness became synonymous with capitalism and Wall Street, having been shown in Berenice Abbott's photos as well as the 1921 documentary film Manhatta, and Bankers Trust sent a miniature model of the building to the Panama–Pacific International Exposition in 1915. Christopher Gray said that the massive height of 14 Wall Street posed a sharp contrast to the one-story 23 Wall Street, diagonally across Wall and Broad Streets, though both were designed by Trowbridge & Livingston and occupied by J.P. Morgan.

14 Wall Street's pyramidal roof inspired the design of several other buildings. Its completion was described as the "beginning of a vogue for the use of a temple or mausoleum" at the top of skyscrapers, utilizing enhanced details or a full depiction of a temple. Architecture magazine projected that such a roof "will be used a great many times more". Several roofs in Lower Manhattan were influenced by 14 Wall Street's design, including those of 26 Broadway, 60 Wall Street, the annex of 195 Broadway, and the Jewish Museum annex.  14 Wall Street's architecture also provided inspiration for buildings in other cities, such as the Union Central Life Insurance Company Building in Cincinnati, the Metropolitan Tower in Chicago, and the Foshay Tower in Minneapolis.

The New York City Landmarks Preservation Commission designated 14 Wall Street as an official city landmark in January 1997. In 2007, the building was designated as a contributing property to the Wall Street Historic District, a National Register of Historic Places district.

See also 

 List of New York City Designated Landmarks in Manhattan below 14th Street

References

Notes

Citations

Sources

External links 

 

1912 establishments in New York City
Art Deco architecture in Manhattan
Art Deco skyscrapers
Financial District, Manhattan
Neoclassical architecture in New York City
New York City Designated Landmarks in Manhattan
Office buildings completed in 1912
Skyscraper office buildings in Manhattan
Wall Street
Bank buildings in Manhattan
Historic bank buildings in the United States
Historic district contributing properties in Manhattan